Seal (sometimes referred to as Seal II to avoid confusion with the 1991 album of the same name) is the second eponymous studio album by British singer Seal. The album was released in 1994 on ZTT and Sire Records and features the worldwide smash hit single "Kiss from a Rose".

The image on the cover has since become nearly synonymous with Seal, in that it has appeared on several singles covers and was reused for his greatest hits album.

Track listing

Personnel
Seal – vocals
Gus Isidore, Jamie Muhoberac, Lisa Coleman, Wendy Melvoin – principal musicians
Joseph "Amp" Fiddler, Andy Duncan, Andy Newmark, Anne Dudley, Anthony Pleeth, Barry Wilde, Ben Cruft, Betsy Cook, Bill Benham, Bob Smissen, Boguslaw Kostecki, Carmen Rizzo, Charley Drayton, Chris Bruce, Chris Laurence, D'Influence, David Oladunni, David Theodore, Derek Watkins, Dick Morgan, Eddie Roberts, Garfield Jackson, Gavyn Wright, George Robertson, Gota Yashiki, Harvey Mason, Helen Liebmann, Ian Thomas, Jackie Shave, Jeff Beck, Jim McLeod, John Pigneguy, Jonathan Evans-Jones, Judd Proctor, Katie Wilkinson, Laurence Cottle, Luís Jardim, Maciej Rakowski, Mark Berrow, Mark Mann, Martin Loveday, Mike Brittain, Mike De Saulles, Nick Busch, Pandit Dinesh, Patrick Kiernan, Paul Kegg, Perry Montague-Mason, Peter Oxer, Phil Spalding, Pino Palladino, Richard Cottle, Rita Manning, Roger Garland, Roger Smith, Sam Maitland, Sarah Webb, Seal, Tim Weidner, Tony Stanton, Trevor Horn, Wilfred Gibson, William Orbit – musicians
Anne Dudley, Wil Malone – string arrangements
Eric Caudieux – programming
Graeme Perkins – orchestration
Nick Knight – cover photography

Charts

Weekly charts

Year-end charts

Certifications

References

Seal (musician) albums
1994 albums
Albums produced by Trevor Horn
ZTT Records albums
Sire Records albums
Warner Music Group albums